The 1992 United States presidential election in Wisconsin took place on November 3, 1992, as part of the 1992 United States presidential election. Voters chose 11 representatives, or electors to the Electoral College, who voted for president and vice president.

Wisconsin was won by Governor Bill Clinton (D-Arkansas) with 41.13 percent of the popular vote over incumbent President George H. W. Bush (R-Texas) with 36.78 percent. Businessman Ross Perot (I-Texas) finished in third, with 21.51 percent of the popular vote. Clinton ultimately won the national vote, defeating incumbent President Bush. 

, this is the last election in which Florence County voted for a Democratic presidential candidate, and the last time that Door County backed a losing candidate. Despite Clinton's decently solid victory in Wisconsin, it marks his narrowest one in a state that Michael Dukakis won in 1988. This marks the first time the state voted Democratic in consecutive elections since 1940.

Results

Results by county

See also
 United States presidential elections in Wisconsin

Notes

References

Wisconsin
1992
1992 Wisconsin elections